Khin Marlar Tun is a footballer from Burma who currently plays as a forward.

Honours

ISPE FC
 2019 Myanmar Women's League Champion

College of Asian Scholars
 2021 Thailand Women's LeagueChampion

ISPE FC
 2022 Myanmar Women's League
Champion }

International goals
.''Scores and results list Myanmar's goal tally first.

See also
List of Myanmar women's international footballers

External links 
 

Living people
Burmese women's footballers
Myanmar women's international footballers
Women's association football forwards
Southeast Asian Games bronze medalists for Myanmar
Southeast Asian Games medalists in football
Competitors at the 2007 Southeast Asian Games
Competitors at the 2017 Southeast Asian Games
1989 births
Competitors at the 2019 Southeast Asian Games